Tony Martin (September 3, 1947 – May 13, 2005) was an American rower. He competed in the men's coxed four event at the 1968 Summer Olympics.

References

External links
 

1947 births
2005 deaths
American male rowers
Olympic rowers of the United States
Rowers at the 1968 Summer Olympics
Rowers from Philadelphia